Tazianeh Qeirat is an Iranian newspaper in Fars Province. The concessionaire of this newspaper was Mankou Ghaane Zolkheir and it was published in Shiraz since 1915.

See also
List of magazines and newspapers of Fars

References

Newspapers published in Fars Province
Mass media in Fars Province
Newspapers published in Qajar Iran